Gerhard Leopold Karl Siedl (22 March 1929 – 9 May 1998) was a German footballer who played international football for both the Saar and West German national teams. In 1953, he scored the winning goal in Oslo against Norway in the qualifiers for the 1954 FIFA World Cup. The match was Saar's only road victory in its brief history.

During his club career he played for FC Bayern Munich (1945–1948, 1951–1953, 1957–1960), Borussia Neunkirchen (1948–1949), 1. FC Saarbrücken, Karlsruher SC, FC Basel, AZ, SV Austria Salzburg, and FC Dornbirn 1913. With Bayern he won the 1957 DFB-Pokal.

Sources and References
 Rotblau: Jahrbuch Saison 2014/2015. Publisher: FC Basel Marketing AG.

External links
 
 
 

1929 births
1998 deaths
Footballers from Munich
Saar footballers
German footballers
West German expatriate sportspeople in Switzerland
Saarland international footballers
Germany international footballers
Dual internationalists (football)
FC Bayern Munich footballers
1. FC Saarbrücken players
Karlsruher SC players
FC Basel players
FC Red Bull Salzburg players
Borussia Neunkirchen players
Association football forwards
West German expatriate sportspeople in the Netherlands
West German expatriate sportspeople in Austria
West German expatriate footballers
West German footballers